

Events

Pre-1600
AD 14 – Agrippa Postumus, maternal grandson of the late Roman emperor Augustus, is mysteriously executed by his guards while in exile.
 636 – Battle of Yarmouk: Arab forces led by Khalid ibn al-Walid take control of the Levant away from the Byzantine Empire, marking the first great wave of Muslim conquests and the rapid advance of Islam outside Arabia.
 917 – Battle of Acheloos: Tsar Simeon I of Bulgaria decisively defeats a Byzantine army.
1083 – Canonization of the first King of Hungary, Saint Stephen and his son Saint Emeric celebrated as a National Day in Hungary.
1191 – Richard I of England initiates the Massacre at Ayyadieh, leaving 2,600–3,000 Muslim hostages dead.
1308 – Pope Clement V pardons Jacques de Molay, the last Grand Master of the Knights Templar, absolving him of charges of heresy.
1391 – Konrad von Wallenrode becomes the 24th Grand Master of the Teutonic Order.
1467 – The Second Battle of Olmedo takes places as part of a succession conflict between Henry IV of Castile and his half-brother Alfonso, Prince of Asturias.
1519 – Philosopher and general Wang Yangming defeats Zhu Chenhao, ending the Prince of Ning rebellion against the reign of the Ming dynasty's Zhengde Emperor.

1601–1900
1648 – Battle of Lens: An outnumbered and hastily assembled French army under Louis II de Bourbon, Prince de Condé, decisively defeats a Spanish army led by Archduke Leopold Wilhelm of Austria near Lens in the last major military confrontation of the Thirty Years' War, contributing to the signing of the Peace of Westphalia in October that year.
1672 – Former Grand Pensionary Johan de Witt and his brother Cornelis are lynched by a mob in The Hague.
1707 – The first Siege of Pensacola comes to an end with the failure of the British to capture Pensacola, Florida.
1710 – War of the Spanish Succession: A multinational army led by the Austrian commander Guido Starhemberg defeats the Spanish-Bourbon army commanded by Alexandre Maître, Marquis de Bay in the Battle of Saragossa.
1775 – The Spanish establish the Presidio San Augustin del Tucson in the town that became Tucson, Arizona.
1794 – Northwest Indian War: United States troops force a confederacy of Shawnee, Mingo, Delaware, Wyandot, Miami, Ottawa, Chippewa, and Potawatomi warriors into a disorganized retreat at the Battle of Fallen Timbers.
1852 – Steamboat Atlantic sank on Lake Erie after a collision, with the loss of at least 150 lives.
1858 – Charles Darwin first publishes his theory of evolution through natural selection in The Journal of the Proceedings of the Linnean Society of London, alongside Alfred Russel Wallace's same theory.
1864 – Bakumatsu: Kinmon incident: Three columns of jōi shishi from the Chōshū Domain led by Kijima Matabei and Kusaka Genzui assault and set fire to the Japanese imperial capital of Kyoto in an attempt to expel the Satsuma and Aizu Domains from the imperial court. Their defeat prompts the Tokugawa shogunate to rally all daimyos across the nation to launch a collective retaliatory expedition against the Chōshū four days later.
1866 – President Andrew Johnson formally declares the American Civil War over.
1882 – Tchaikovsky's 1812 Overture debuts in Moscow, Russia.

1901–present
1905 – Sun Yat-sen, Song Jiaoren, and others establish the Tongmenghui, a Republican, anti-Qing revolutionary organisation, in Tokyo, Japan.
1914 – World War I: Brussels is captured during the German invasion of Belgium.
1920 – The first commercial radio station, 8MK (now WWJ), begins operations in Detroit.
  1920   – The National Football League is organized as the American Professional Football Conference in Canton, Ohio
1926 – Japan's public broadcasting company, Nippon Hōsō Kyōkai (NHK) is established.
1938 – Lou Gehrig hits his 23rd career grand slam, a record that stood for 75 years until it was broken by Alex Rodriguez.
1940 – In Mexico City, exiled Russian revolutionary Leon Trotsky is fatally wounded with an ice axe by Ramón Mercader. He dies the next day.
  1940   – World War II: British Prime Minister Winston Churchill makes the fourth of his famous wartime speeches, containing the line "Never was so much owed by so many to so few".
  1940   – World War II: Hundred Regiments Offensive: Chinese general Peng Dehuai of the Communist Eighth Route Army launches the Hundred Regiments Offensive, a successful campaign to disrupt Japanese war infrastructure and logistics in occupied northern China.
1944 – World War II: One hundred sixty-eight captured allied airmen, including Phil Lamason, accused by the Gestapo of being "terror fliers", arrive at Buchenwald concentration camp.
  1944   – World War II: The Battle of Romania begins with a major Soviet Union offensive.
1948 – Soviet Consul General in New York, Jacob M. Lomakin is expelled by the United States, due to the Kasenkina Case.
1949 – Hungary adopts the Hungarian Constitution of 1949 and becomes a People’s Republic.
1955 – Battle of Philippeville: In Morocco, a force of Berbers from the Atlas Mountains region of Algeria raid two rural settlements and kill 77 French nationals.
1960 – Senegal breaks from the Mali Federation, declaring its independence.
1962 – The NS Savannah, the world's first nuclear-powered civilian ship, embarks on its maiden voyage.
1968 – Cold War: Warsaw Pact troops invade Czechoslovakia, crushing the Prague Spring. East German participation is limited to a few specialists due to memories of the recent war. Only Albania and Romania refuse to participate.
1975 – Viking program: NASA launches the Viking 1 planetary probe toward Mars.
  1975   – ČSA Flight 540 crashes on approach to Damascus International Airport in Damascus, Syria, killing 126 people.
1977 – Voyager program: NASA launches the Voyager 2 spacecraft.
1986 – In Edmond, Oklahoma, U.S. Postal employee Patrick Sherrill guns down 14 of his co-workers and then commits suicide.
1988 – "Black Saturday" of the Yellowstone fire in Yellowstone National Park
  1988   – Iran–Iraq War: A ceasefire is agreed after almost eight years of war.
  1988   – The Troubles: Eight British soldiers are killed and 28 wounded when their bus is hit by an IRA roadside bomb in Ballygawley, County Tyrone.
1989 – The pleasure boat Marchioness sinks on the River Thames following a collision. Fifty-one people are killed.
1991 – Dissolution of the Soviet Union, August Coup: More than 100,000 people rally outside the Soviet Union's parliament building protesting the coup aiming to depose President Mikhail Gorbachev.
  1991   – Estonia, occupied by and incorporated into the Soviet Union in 1940, issues a decision on the re-establishment of independence on the basis of legal continuity of its pre-occupation statehood.
  1992   – In India, Meitei language (officially known as Manipuri language) was included in the scheduled languages' list and made one of the official languages of the Indian Government.
1993 – After rounds of secret negotiations in Norway, the Oslo Accords are signed, followed by a public ceremony in Washington, D.C. the following month.
1995 – The Firozabad rail disaster kills 358 people in Firozabad, India.
1997 – Souhane massacre in Algeria; over 60 people are killed and 15 kidnapped.
1998 – The Supreme Court of Canada rules that Quebec cannot legally secede from Canada without the federal government's approval.
  1998   – U.S. embassy bombings: The United States launches cruise missile attacks against alleged al-Qaeda camps in Afghanistan and a suspected chemical weapons plant in Sudan in retaliation for the August 7 bombings of American embassies in Kenya and Tanzania.
2002 – A group of Iraqis opposed to the regime of Saddam Hussein take over the Iraqi embassy in Berlin, Germany for five hours before releasing their hostages and surrendering.
2006 – Sri Lankan Civil War: Sri Lankan Tamil politician and former MP S. Sivamaharajah is shot dead at his home in Tellippalai.
2007 – China Airlines Flight 120 catches fire and explodes after landing at Naha Airport in Okinawa, Japan.
2008 – Spanair Flight 5022, from Madrid, Spain to Gran Canaria, skids off the runway and crashes at Barajas Airport. Of the 172 people on board, 146 die immediately, and eight more later die of injuries sustained in the crash.
2012 – A prison riot in the Venezuelan capital, Caracas, kills at least 20 people.
2014 – Seventy-two people are killed in Japan's Hiroshima Prefecture by a series of landslides caused by a month's worth of rain that fell in one day.
2016 – Fifty-four people are killed when a suicide bomber detonates himself at a Kurdish wedding party in Gaziantep, Turkey.
2020 – Joe Biden gives his acceptance speech virtually for the 2020 Democratic presidential nomination at the 2020 Democratic National Convention.

Births

Pre-1600
1377 – Shahrukh Mirza, ruler of Persia and Transoxiania (d. 1447)
1517 – Antoine Perrenot de Granvelle, French cardinal and art collector (d. 1586)
1561 – Jacopo Peri, Italian singer and composer (d. 1633)

1601–1900
1625 – Thomas Corneille, French playwright and philologist (d. 1709)
1632 – Louis Bourdaloue, French preacher and academic (d. 1704)
1659 – Henry Every, English pirate (d. 1696)
1710 – Thomas Simpson, English mathematician and academic (d. 1761)
1719 – Christian Mayer, Czech astronomer and educator (d. 1783)
1720 – Bernard de Bury, French harpsichord player and composer (d. 1785)
1778 – Bernardo O'Higgins, Chilean general and politician, 2nd Supreme Director of Chile (d. 1842)
1779 – Jöns Jacob Berzelius, Swedish chemist and academic (d. 1848)
1789 – Abbas Mirza, Qajar crown prince of Persia (d. 1833)
1799 – James Prinsep, English orientalist and scholar (d. 1840)
1833 – Benjamin Harrison, American general, lawyer, and politician, 23rd President of the United States (d. 1901)
1845 – Albert Chmielowski, Polish saint, founded the Albertine Brothers (d. 1916)
1847 – Andrew Greenwood, English cricketer (d. 1889)
  1847   – Bolesław Prus, Polish journalist and author (d. 1912)
1856 – Jakub Bart-Ćišinski, German poet and playwright (d. 1909)
1860 – Raymond Poincaré, French lawyer and politician, 10th President of France (d. 1934)
1865 – Bernard Tancred, South African cricketer and lawyer (d. 1911)
1868 – Ellen Roosevelt, American tennis player (d. 1954)
1873 – Eliel Saarinen, Finnish architect and academic, co-designed the National Museum of Finland (d. 1950)
1881 – Edgar Guest, English-American poet and author (d. 1959)
  1881   – Aleksander Hellat, Estonian politician, 6th Estonian Minister of Foreign Affairs (d. 1943)
1884 – Rudolf Bultmann, German Lutheran theologian and professor of New Testament at the University of Marburg (d. 1976)
1885 – Dino Campana, Italian poet and author (d. 1932)
1886 – Paul Tillich, German-American philosopher and theologian (d. 1965)
1887 – Phan Khôi, Vietnamese journalist and scholar (d. 1959)
1888 – Tôn Đức Thắng, Vietnamese politician, 2nd President of Vietnam (d. 1980)
1890 – H. P. Lovecraft, American short story writer, editor, novelist (d. 1937)
1896 – Gostha Pal, Indian footballer (d. 1976)
1897 – Tarjei Vesaas, Norwegian author and poet (d. 1970)
1898 – Vilhelm Moberg, Swedish historian, journalist, author, and playwright (d. 1973)

1901–present
1901 – Salvatore Quasimodo, Italian novelist and poet, Nobel Prize laureate (d. 1968)
1905 – Jean Gebser, German linguist, poet, and philosopher (d. 1973)
  1905   – Mikio Naruse, Japanese director and screenwriter (d. 1969)
  1905   – Jack Teagarden, American singer-songwriter and trombonist (d. 1964)
  1906   – Vidrik Rootare, Estonian chess player (d. 1981)
1908 – Al López, American baseball player and manager (d. 2005)
1909 – André Morell, English actor (d. 1978)
  1909   – Alby Roberts, New Zealand cricketer and rugby player (d. 1978)
1910 – Eero Saarinen, Finnish-American architect and furniture designer, designed the Gateway Arch (d. 1961)
1912 – John H. Michaelis, American general (d. 1985)
1913 – Roger Wolcott Sperry, American neuropsychologist and neurobiologist, Nobel Prize laureate (d. 1994)
1916 – Paul Felix Schmidt, Estonian–German chess player and chemist (d. 1984)
1917 – Terry Sanford, 65th Governor of North Carolina (d. 1998)
1918 – Jacqueline Susann, American actress and author (d. 1974)
1919 – Walter Bernstein, American screenwriter and producer (d. 2021)
  1919   – Adamantios Androutsopoulos, Greek lawyer, educator and politician, Prime Minister of Greece (d. 2000)
1921 – Keith Froome, Australian rugby league player (d. 1978)
  1921   – Jack Wilson, Australian cricketer (d. 1985)
1923 – Jim Reeves, American singer-songwriter (d. 1964)
1924 – George Zuverink, American baseball player (d. 2014)
1926 – Frank Rosolino, American jazz trombonist (d. 1978)
1926 – Nobby Wirkowski, American-Canadian football player and coach (d. 2014)
1927 – John Boardman, English archaeologist and historian
  1927   – Yootha Joyce, English actress (d. 1980)
  1927   – Fred Kavli, Norwegian-American businessman and philanthropist, founded The Kavli Foundation (d. 2013)
  1927   – Peter Oakley, English soldier and blogger (d. 2014)
1929 – Kevin Heffernan, Irish footballer and manager (d. 2013)
1930 – Mario Bernardi, Canadian pianist and conductor (d. 2013)
  1930   – Peter Randall, English sergeant (d. 2007)
1931 – Don King, American boxing promoter
1932 – Anthony Ainley, English actor (d. 2004)
  1932   – Vasily Aksyonov, Russian physician, author, and academic (d. 2009)
  1932   – Atholl McKinnon, South African cricketer (d. 1983)
1933 – Ted Donaldson, American actor (d. 2023)
  1933   – George J. Mitchell, American lieutenant, lawyer, and politician
1934 – Sneaky Pete Kleinow, American country-rock pedal-steel guitarist and songwriter (d. 2007)
  1934   – Tom Mangold, German-English journalist and author
1935 – Ron Paul, American captain, physician, and politician
1936 – Hideki Shirakawa, Japanese chemist, engineer, and academic, Nobel Prize laureate
1937 – Stelvio Cipriani, Italian composer (d. 2018)
  1937   – Andrei Konchalovsky, Russian director, producer, and screenwriter
  1937   – Sky Saxon, American singer-songwriter and bassist (d. 2009)
1938 – Jean-Loup Chrétien, French military officer and astronaut
  1938   – Peter Day, English chemist and academic (d. 2020)
  1938   – Alain Vivien, French politician
1939 – Fernando Poe Jr., Filipino actor and politician (d. 2004)
  1939   – Mike Velarde, Filipino televangelist and religious leader
1940 – Rubén Hinojosa, American businessman and politician
  1940   – Gus Macdonald, Scottish academic and politician, Minister for the Cabinet Office
  1940   – Rex Sellers, Indian-Australian cricketer
1941 – Dave Brock, English singer-songwriter and guitarist
  1941   – Rich Brooks, American football player and coach
  1941   – Anne Evans, English soprano and actress
  1941   – William H. Gray, American lawyer and politician (d. 2013)
  1941   – Slobodan Milošević, Serbian lawyer and politician, 1st President of Serbia (d. 2006)
  1941   – Robin Oakley, English journalist and author
  1941   – Jo Ramírez, Mexican race car driver and manager
1942 – Isaac Hayes, American singer-songwriter, pianist, producer, and actor (d. 2008)
  1942   – Fred Norman, American baseball player
1943 – Roger Gale, English journalist and politician
  1943   – Sylvester McCoy, Scottish actor
1944 – Rajiv Gandhi, Indian lawyer and politician, 6th Prime Minister of India (d. 1991)
  1944   – Graig Nettles, American baseball player and manager
  1944   – José Wilker, Brazilian actor and director (d. 2014)
1945 – Roy Gardner, English businessman
1946 – Mufaddal Saifuddin, 53rd Da'i al-Mutlaq of Fatimid Caliphate 
  1946   – Henryk Broder, Polish-German journalist and author
  1946   – Connie Chung, American journalist
  1946   – Laurent Fabius, French politician, 158th Prime Minister of France
  1946   – Ralf Hütter, German singer and keyboard player
  1946   – N. R. Narayana Murthy, Indian businessman, co-founded Infosys
1947 – Alan Lee, English painter and illustrator
  1947   – Ray Wise, American actor
1948 – John Noble, Australian actor and director
  1948   – Robert Plant, English singer-songwriter
1949 – Nikolas Asimos, Greek singer-songwriter and guitarist (d. 1988)
  1949   – Phil Lynott, Irish singer-songwriter, bass player, and producer (d. 1986)
1951 – DeForest Soaries, American minister and politician, 30th Secretary of State of New Jersey
1952 – John Emburey, English cricketer and coach
  1952   – Doug Fieger, American singer-songwriter and guitarist (d. 2010)
  1952   – John Hiatt, American singer-songwriter and guitarist
  1952   – Ric Menello, American director and screenwriter (d. 2013)
1953 – Gerry Bertier, American football player (d. 1981)
  1953   – Peter Horton, American actor and director
  1953   – Mike Jackson, American politician
  1953   – Jim Trenton, American radio host and actor
  1953   – Leroy Burgess, American singer, songwriter, keyboard player, recording artist, and record producer
1954 – Quinn Buckner, American basketball player and coach
  1954   – Tawn Mastrey, American radio host and producer (d. 2007)
  1954   – Al Roker, American news anchor, television personality, and author
1955 – Agnes Chan, Hong Kong singer and author
  1955   – Janet Royall, Baroness Royall of Blaisdon, English politician, Chancellor of the Duchy of Lancaster
1956 – Joan Allen, American actress
  1956   – Alvin Greenidge, Barbadian cricketer
  1956   – Desmond Swayne, English soldier and politician, Vice-Chamberlain of the Household
1957 – Finlay Calder, Scottish rugby player
  1957   – Jim Calder, Scottish rugby player
  1957   – Simon Donaldson, English mathematician and academic
  1957   – Sorin Antohi, Romanian journalist and historian
  1957   – Paul Johnson, American football coach
1958 – Nigel Dodds, Northern Irish lawyer and politician
  1958   – Patricia Rozema, Canadian director and screenwriter
  1958   – David O. Russell, American director and screenwriter
  1958   – John Stehr, American journalist
1960 – Dom Duff, Breton singer-songwriter, guitarist, composer
  1960   – Mark Langston, American baseball player
1961 – Amanda Sonia Berry, English businesswoman
1962 – James Marsters, American actor
1963 – Uwe Bialon, German footballer and manager
  1963   – Kal Daniels, American baseball player
  1963   – José Cecena, Mexican baseball player
1964 – Azarias Ruberwa, Congolese lawyer and politician, Vice-President of the Democratic Republic of the Congo
1965 – KRS-One, American rapper and producer
1966 – Miguel Albaladejo, Spanish director and screenwriter
  1966   – Dimebag Darrell, American guitarist and songwriter (d. 2004)
  1966   – Enrico Letta, Italian lawyer and politician, 55th Prime Minister of Italy
  1966   – Liu Chunyan, Chinese host and voice actress
1967 – Andy Benes, American baseball player
1968 – Brett Angell, English footballer and coach
  1968   – Abdelatif Benazzi, Moroccan-French rugby player
  1968   – Klas Ingesson, Swedish footballer and manager (d. 2014)
  1968   – Yuri Shiratori, Japanese voice actress and singer
  1968   – Bai Yansong, Chinese host
1969 – Billy Gardell, American comedian, actor, and producer
  1969   – Mark Holzemer, American baseball player and scout
1970 – Els Callens, Belgian tennis player and sportscaster
  1970   – Fred Durst, American singer-songwriter
1971 – Nenad Bjelica, Croatian footballer and manager
  1971   – Matt Calland, English rugby player and coach
  1971   – Steve Stone, English footballer and coach
  1971   – David Walliams, English comedian, actor, and author
  1971   – Ke Huy Quan, Vietnamese actor
1972 – Derrick Alston, American basketball player
  1972   – Melvin Booker, American basketball player
  1972   – Chaney Kley, American actor (d. 2007)
  1972   – Scott Quinnell, Welsh rugby player and sportscaster
  1972   – Anna Umemiya, Japanese model and actress
1973 – Alban Bushi, Albanian footballer
  1973   – Alexandre Finazzi, Brazilian footballer
  1973   – Scott Goodman, Australian swimmer
  1973   – Todd Helton, American baseball player
  1973   – Cameron Mather, New Zealand rugby player and sportscaster
  1973   – José Paniagua, Dominican baseball player
  1973   – Donn Swaby, American actor and screenwriter
  1973   – Juan Becerra Acosta, Mexican journalist
1974 – Amy Adams, American actress and singer
  1974   – Misha Collins, American actor
  1974   – Szabolcs Sáfár, Hungarian footballer and coach
  1974   – Andy Strachan, Australian drummer and songwriter
  1974   – Maxim Vengerov, Russian-Israeli violinist and conductor
1975 – Marcin Adamski, Polish footballer and manager
  1975   – Marko Martin, Estonian pianist and educator
  1975   – Shaun Newton, English footballer
  1975   – Elijah Williams, American football player and coach
1976 – Chris Drury, American ice hockey player
  1976   – Cornel Frăsineanu, Romanian footballer
  1976   – Tony Grant, Irish footballer
  1976   – Kristen Miller, American actress, producer, and screenwriter
  1976   – Marcel Podszus, German footballer
  1976   – Fabio Ulloa, Honduran footballer
1977 – Paolo Bianco, Italian footballer
  1977   – Wayne Brown, English footballer
  1977   – Felipe Contepomi, Argentine rugby player, coach, and physician
  1977   – Manuel Contepomi, Argentine rugby player
  1977   – Shockmain Davis, American football player
  1977   – Stéphane Gillet, Luxembourgian footballer
  1977   – Aaron Hamill, Australian footballer and coach
  1977   – Ívar Ingimarsson, Icelandic footballer
  1977   – James Ormond, English cricketer
  1977   – Josh Pearce, American baseball player
  1977   – Aaron Taylor, American baseball player
1978 – Alberto Martín, Spanish tennis player
  1978   – Emir Mkademi, Tunisian footballer
  1978   – Jennifer Ramírez Rivero, Venezuelan model and businesswoman (d. 2018)
  1978   – Chris Schroder, American baseball player
1979 – Sarah Borwell, English tennis player
  1979   – Jamie Cullum, English singer-songwriter and pianist
  1979   – Cory Sullivan, American baseball player
1981 – Ben Barnes, English actor
  1981   – Brett Finch, Australian rugby league player and sportscaster
  1981   – Artur Kotenko, Estonian footballer
  1981   – Bernard Mendy, French footballer
  1981   – Craig Ochs, American football player
  1981   – Byron Saxton, American wrestler, manager, and sportscaster
1982 – Cléber Luis Alberti, Brazilian footballer
  1982   – Aleksandr Amisulashvili, Georgian footballer
  1982   – Monty Dumond, South African rugby player
  1982   – Youssouf Hersi, Ethiopian footballer
  1982   – Joshua Kennedy, Australian footballer
  1982   – Mijaín López, Cuban wrestler
  1982   – Richard Petiot, Canadian ice hockey player
  1982   – Barney Rogers, Zimbabwean cricketer
  1982   – Enyelbert Soto, Venezuelan-Japanese baseball player
1983 – Hamza Abdullah, American football player
  1983   – Paulo André Cren Benini, Brazilian footballer
  1983   – Andrew Garfield, American-English actor
  1983   – Héctor Landazuri, Colombian footballer
  1983   – Mladen Pelaić, Croatian footballer
  1983   – Brian Schaefering, American football player
  1983   – Yuri Zhirkov, Russian footballer
1984 – Aílton José Almeida, Brazilian footballer
  1984   – Pavel Eismann, Czech footballer
  1984   – Laura Georges, French footballer
  1984   – Jamie Hoffmann, American baseball player
  1984   – Ingrid Lukas, Estonian-Swiss singer-songwriter and pianist
1985 – Brant Daugherty, American actor
  1985   – Glen Buttriss, Australian rugby league player
  1985   – Blake DeWitt, American baseball player
  1985   – Thomas Domingo, French rugby player
  1985   – Matt Hague, American baseball player
  1985   – Jack King, English footballer
  1985   – Álvaro Negredo, Spanish footballer
  1985   – Willie Ripia, New Zealand rugby player
  1985   – Joe Vitale, American ice hockey player
  1985   – Stephen Ward, Irish footballer
  1985   – Mark Washington, American football player
1986 – Andrew Surman, South African-English footballer
  1986   – Steven Zalewski, American ice hockey player
1987 – Stefan Aigner, German footballer
  1987   – Vedran Janjetović, Croatian-Australian footballer
  1987   – Sido Jombati, Portuguese footballer
  1987   – Egon Kaur, Estonian race car driver
1988 – Jerryd Bayless, American basketball player
  1988   – Sarah R, Lotfi, American director, producer, and screenwriter
  1988   – José Zamora, Spanish footballer
1989 – Kirko Bangz, American rapper and producer
  1989   – Nebil Gahwagi, Hungarian footballer
  1989   – Silas Kiplagat, Kenyan runner
  1989   – Slavcho Shokolarov, Bulgarian footballer
  1989   – Judd Trump, English snooker player
  1989   – Dean Winnard, English footballer
1990 – Macauley Chrisantus, Nigerian footballer
  1990   – Culoe De Song, South African music producer and DJ
  1990   – Venelin Filipov, Bulgarian footballer
  1990   – Leigh Griffiths, Scottish footballer
  1990   – Fabien Jarsalé, French footballer
  1990   – Bradley Klahn, American tennis player
  1990   – Ranomi Kromowidjojo, Dutch swimmer
1991 – Marko Djokovic, Serbian tennis player
  1991   – Jyrki Jokipakka, Finnish hockey player
1992 – Matt Eisenhuth, Australian rugby league player
  1992   – Carolina Horta, Brazilian beach volleyball player
  1992   – Demi Lovato, American singer-songwriter and actor
  1992   – Deniss Rakels, Latvian footballer
  1992   – Callum Skinner, Scottish track cyclist
1993 – Tonisha Rock-Yaw, Barbadian netball player
1996 – Bunty Afoa, New Zealand rugby league player
2003 – Prince Gabriel of Belgium

Deaths

Pre-1600
AD 14 – Agrippa Postumus, Roman son of Marcus Vipsanius Agrippa (b. 12 BC)
 535 – Mochta, Irish missionary and saint
 651 – Oswine of Deira
 768 – Eadberht of Northumbria
 917 – Constantine Lips, Byzantine admiral
 984 – Pope John XIV
1153 – Bernard of Clairvaux, French theologian and saint (b. 1090)
1158 – Rögnvald Kali Kolsson (b. 1100), Earl of Orkney and Saint
1297 – William Fraser, bishop and Guardian of Scotland
1348 – Laurence Hastings, 1st Earl of Pembroke (b. 1319)
1384 – Geert Groote, Dutch preacher, founded the Brethren of the Common Life (b. 1340)
1386 – Bo Jonsson, royal marshal of Sweden
1471 – Borso d'Este, Duke of Ferrara (b. 1413)
1528 – Georg von Frundsberg, German knight and landowner (b. 1473)
1572 – Miguel López de Legazpi, Spanish navigator and politician, 1st Governor-General of the Philippines (b. 1502)
1580 – Jerónimo Osório, Portuguese historian and author (b. 1506)

1601–1900
1611 – Tomás Luis de Victoria, Spanish priest and composer (b. 1548)
1639 – Martin Opitz, German poet and hymnwriter (b. 1597)
1648 – Edward Herbert, 1st Baron Herbert of Cherbury, English soldier and diplomat (b. 1583)
1651 – Jeremi Wiśniowiecki, Polish nobleman (b. 1612)
1672 – Cornelis de Witt, Dutch lawyer and politician (b. 1623)
  1672   – Johan de Witt, Dutch mathematician and politician (b. 1625)
1680 – William Bedloe, English spy (b. 1650)
1701 – Sir Charles Sedley, 5th Baronet, English playwright and politician (b. 1639)
1707 – Nicolas Gigault, French organist and composer (b. 1627)
1773 – Enrique Flórez, Spanish historian and author (b. 1701)
1785 – Jean-Baptiste Pigalle, French sculptor (b. 1714)
1823 – Pope Pius VII (b. 1740)
1825 – William Waldegrave, 1st Baron Radstock, English admiral and politician, Governor of Newfoundland (b. 1753)
1835 – Agnes Bulmer, English merchant and poet (b. 1775)
1854 – Shiranui Dakuemon, Japanese sumo wrestler, the 8th Yokozuna (b. 1801)
1859 – Juan Bautista Ceballos, President of Mexico (1853) (b. 1811)
1882 – James Whyte, Scottish-Australian politician, 6th Premier of Tasmania (b. 1820)
1887 – Jules Laforgue, French poet and author (b. 1860)
1893 – Alexander Wassilko von Serecki, Austrian lawyer and politician (b. 1827)
1897 – Charles Lilley, English-Australian politician, 4th Premier of Queensland (b. 1827)

1901–present
1912 – William Booth, English preacher, co-founded The Salvation Army (b. 1829)
1914 – Pope Pius X (b. 1835)
1915 – Paul Ehrlich, German physician and academic, Nobel Prize laureate (b. 1854)
1917 – Adolf von Baeyer, German chemist and academic, Nobel Prize laureate (b. 1835)
1919 – Greg MacGregor, Scottish cricketer and rugby player (b. 1869)
1930 – Charles Bannerman, Australian cricketer and umpire (b. 1851)
1936 – Edward Weston, English-American chemist (b. 1850)
1939 – Agnes Giberne, Indian-English astronomer and author (b. 1845)
1942 – István Horthy, Hungarian admiral and pilot (b. 1904)
1943 – William Irvine, Irish-Australian politician, 21st Premier of Victoria (b. 1858)
1951 – İzzettin Çalışlar, Turkish general (b. 1882)
1961 – Percy Williams Bridgman, American physicist and academic, Nobel Prize laureate (b. 1882)
1963 – Joan Voûte, Dutch astronomer (b. 1879)
1965 – Jonathan Daniels, American seminarian and civil rights activist (b. 1939)
1971 – Rashid Minhas, Pakistani lieutenant and pilot (b. 1951)
1979 – Christian Dotremont, Belgian painter and poet (b. 1922)
1980 – Joe Dassin, American-French singer-songwriter (b. 1938)
1981 – Michael Devine, Irish Republican 
1982 – Ulla Jacobsson, Swedish actress (b. 1929)
1985 – Donald O. Hebb, Canadian psychologist and academic (b. 1904)
  1985   – Wilhelm Meendsen-Bohlken, German admiral (b. 1897)
1986 – Milton Acorn, Canadian poet and playwright (b. 1923)
1987 – Walenty Kłyszejko, Estonian–Polish basketball player and coach (b. 1909)
1993 – Bernard Delfgaauw, Dutch philosopher and academic (b. 1912)
1995 – Hugo Pratt, Italian author and illustrator (b. 1927)
1996 – Rio Reiser, German singer-songwriter (b. 1950)
1997 – Norris Bradbury, American soldier, physicist, and academic (b. 1909)
  1997   – Léon Dion, Canadian political scientist and academic (b. 1922)
1998 – Vũ Văn Mẫu, 10th and final Prime Minister of South Vietnam (b. 1914)
2001 – Fred Hoyle, English astronomer and author (b. 1915)
  2001   – Kim Stanley, American actress (b. 1925)
2005 – Thomas Herrion, American football player (b. 1981)
  2005   – Krzysztof Raczkowski, Polish drummer and songwriter (b. 1970)
2006 – Bryan Budd, Northern Ireland-born English soldier, Victoria Cross recipient (b. 1977)
  2006   – Joe Rosenthal, American photographer and journalist (b. 1911)
  2006   – S. Sivamaharajah, Sri Lankan Tamil newspaper publisher and politician (b. 1938)
2007 – Leona Helmsley, American businesswoman (b. 1920)
2008 – Ed Freeman, American soldier and pilot, Medal of Honor recipient (b. 1927)
  2008   – Hua Guofeng, Chinese politician, 2nd Premier of the People's Republic of China (b. 1921)
  2008   – Stephanie Tubbs Jones, American lawyer and politician (b. 1949)
  2008   – Gene Upshaw, American football player (b. 1945)
2009 – Larry Knechtel, American keyboardist and bass player (b. 1940)
  2009   – Karla Kuskin, American author and illustrator (b. 1932)
2010 – Đặng Phong, Vietnamese economist and historian (b. 1937)
2011 – Ram Sharan Sharma, Indian historian and academic (b. 1919)
2012 – Phyllis Diller, American actress and comedian (b. 1917)
  2012   – Daryl Hine, Canadian-American poet and academic (b. 1936)
  2012   – Dom Mintoff, Maltese journalist and politician, 8th Prime Minister of Malta (b. 1916)
  2012   – Len Quested, English footballer and manager (b. 1925)
  2012   – Mika Yamamoto, Japanese journalist (b. 1967)
  2012   – Meles Zenawi, Ethiopian soldier and politician, Prime Minister of Ethiopia (b. 1955)
2013 – Sathima Bea Benjamin, South African singer-songwriter (b. 1936)
  2013   – Narendra Dabholkar, Indian author and activist (b. 1945)
  2013   – Don Hassler, American saxophonist and composer (b. 1929)
  2013   – Elmore Leonard, American novelist, short story writer, and screenwriter (b. 1925)
  2013   – Marian McPartland, English-American pianist and composer (b. 1918)
  2013   – John W. Morris, American general (b. 1921)
  2013   – Ted Post, American director and screenwriter (b. 1918)
2014 – Anton Buslov, Russian astrophysicist and journalist (b. 1983)
  2014   – Lois Mai Chan, Taiwanese-American librarian, author, and academic (b. 1934)
  2014   – Boris Dubin, Russian sociologist and academic (b. 1946)
  2014   – B. K. S. Iyengar, Indian yoga instructor and author, founded Iyengar Yoga (b. 1918)
  2014   – Buddy MacMaster, Canadian singer-songwriter and fiddler (b. 1924)
  2014   – Sava Stojkov, Serbian painter and educator (b. 1925)
  2014   – Edmund Szoka, American cardinal (b. 1927)
2015 – Egon Bahr, German journalist and politician, Federal Minister for Special Affairs of Germany (b. 1922)
  2015   – Paul Kibblewhite, New Zealand chemist and engineer (b. 1941)
  2015   – Frank Wilkes, Australian soldier and politician (b. 1922)
2017 – Jerry Lewis, American actor and comedian (b. 1926)
2018 – Uri Avnery, Israeli writer, politician and peace activist (b. 1923)
2021 – Igor Vovkovinskiy, Ukrainian-American law student and actor, American tallest person (b. 1982)

Holidays and observances
 Christian feast day:
 Amadour
 Bernard of Clairvaux
 Blessed Georg Häfner
 Heliodorus of Bet Zabdai
 Maria De Mattias
 Oswine of Deira
 Philibert of Jumièges
 Samuel (prophet)
 William and Catherine Booth (Church of England)
 August 20 (Eastern Orthodox liturgics)
 Feast of Asmá’ (Baháʼí Faith, only if Baháʼí Naw-Rúz falls on March 21)
 Indian Akshay Urja Day (India)
 Independence Restoration Day (Estonia), re-declaration of the independence of Estonia from the Soviet Union in 1991.
 Meitei Language Day, also known as Manipuri Language Day, the day on which Meitei (Manipuri) was included in the scheduled languages' list and made one of the official languages of India.
 Revolution of the King and the People (Morocco)
 Saint Stephen's Day (Hungary)
 World Mosquito Day

References

External links

 
 
 

Days of the year
August